This is a list of Austin Peay Governors football players in the NFL Draft.

Key

Selections

References

Lists of National Football League draftees by college football team

Austin Peay Governors NFL Draft